Ipomoea pandurata, known as man of the earth, wild potato vine, manroot, wild sweet potato, and wild rhubarb, is a species of herbaceous perennial vine native to North America. It is a twining plant of woodland verges and rough places with heart-shaped leaves and funnel-shaped white flowers with a pinkish throat. The large tuberous roots can be roasted and eaten, or can be used to make a poultice or infusion. When uncooked, the roots have purgative properties.

Description
I. pandurata is a twining and scrambling vine that can reach . The flowers develop in the axils of the leaves in groups of one to five. The sepals are light green and hairless, and overlap one another. The flowers are tubular, white with a pinkish or purplish throat. The stamens form a white boss in the middle of the throat. Flowers open overnight and close, on a sunny day, about mid-day, but last longer in cloudy weather. They are followed by capsules containing two to four flat seeds which are noticeably hairy along their outer edges.

Distribution and habitat
The native range is the southern and eastern parts of the United States, extending northwards into Ontario in Canada. Habitats include upland woods, the edges of prairies bordering woodlands, thickets, rocky gullies and stream-sides, disturbed ground, and railway and highway verges.

Ecology
Long-tongued bees such as honey bees, bumblebees and digger bees visit I. pandurata seeking nectar, as do various butterflies and moths. Tortoise beetles of various sorts and the sweet potato leaf beetle feed on the leaves. The larvae of the latter two beetles feed on the swollen tuberous roots, while the larvae of the sweet potato leaf miner, the morning-glory plume moth and the sweetpotato hornworm feed on the foliage. Mammalian herbivorous animals avoid this plant which tastes bitter and is toxic to some extent.

Uses
This can be roasted and eaten, resembling a sweet potato, young specimens being best as older tubers may be bitter. Other uses for the plant include the preparation of a poultice from the roots which can be used to ease pain in rheumatic joints. The roots are also used to prepare an infusion that is said to have expectorant, diuretic and laxative effects.

References

External links

Ipomoea pandurata at Connecticut Botanical Society

pandurata
Flora of North America